The 1959–60 Challenge Cup was the 59th staging of rugby league's oldest knockout competition, the Challenge Cup.

First round

Second round

Quarterfinals

Semifinals

Final
The 1959–60 Challenge Cup tournament ended in a final between Wakefield Trinity and Hull F.C. The match was played at Wembley Stadium before a crowd of 79,773, with Wakefield Trinity winning 38 – 5. Despite being on the losing team, Hull's hooker, Tommy Harris was awarded the Lance Todd Trophy for his man-of-the-match performance.

Neil Fox of Wakefield Trinity scored a Cup final record 20 points (two tries and seven goals) in the final for Wakefield, a feat that would not be repeated for another 39 years 1999.

References

Challenge Cup
Challenge Cup